"Dear Peggy" was the 82nd episode of the M*A*S*H television series, and the tenth episode of season four. The episode aired on November 14, 1975.

Plot
The episode is told from B.J. Hunnicutt's perspective as he writes a letter home to his wife, Peggy, during a quiet period at the camp. B.J. describes life at the hospital from his viewpoint of someone who has recently been assigned there and tells Peggy of Hawkeye Pierce's antics, including his effort to set a world record for the number of personnel stuffed into a jeep, and a visit to the hospital by Col. Hollister, a divisional chaplain and Father Mulcahy's overbearing superior. Col. Hollister coerces Fr. Mulcahy into writing a letter to the parents of a critically ill soldier named Private Davis, claiming that the soldier will be okay, despite Mulcahy's normally cautious procedure of waiting until the patient is clearly on the way to recovery.

Klinger makes numerous attempts to escape from the camp including dressing as an elderly Korean woman, trying to sail down a nearby river using an inflatable raft and camouflaging himself as a bush. (Exclaiming to Hawkeye and B.J., "I would have made it if it hadn't been for that dog!").

Early on in surgery, B.J. saves Davis' life (who Major Frank Burns had initially operated on and was ready to give up on) by using cardio-pulmonary resuscitation.  Later, it is found during Post-Op that Frank failed to remove all shrapnel from Davis' internals as his IV saline is bloody.  Hawkeye has to re-operate on Davis and removes the rest of the shrapnel, saving his life once again.

Colonel Potter orders that local Korean personnel be trained to serve in the recovery ward and this requires them to learn English. Frank Burns and Hawkeye take turns administering the lessons, with Frank teaching them anti-Communist slogans and Hawkeye teaching them to insult Frank.

Historical references

The song that Father Mulcahy is playing on the piano in the Officers' Club at the beginning and end of the episode is Bethena by Scott Joplin.

Hawkeye talks about watching Klinger eat a fresh egg he won in a poker game and facetiously says that for a moment, it evoked the air of "fine dining at Nedick's in Grand Central Station." Nedick's was a real-life fast food chain during the early and mid-twentieth century.

External links

M*A*S*H (season 4) episodes
1975 American television episodes